Yogurt Mountain Franchising LLC, founded by David Kahn and Aaron Greenberg, is a chain of self-serve frozen yogurt dessert bars with 16 rotating flavors of frozen yogurt and over fifty toppings, for which the customer pays by the ounce.

History
The company opened their first store in Birmingham, Alabama in September 2009.  From its base in Birmingham, Yogurt Mountain has expanded into 40+ stores across the southeast.  In April 2010, bookstore chain Books-A-Million paid $3 million for shares in Yogurt Mountain.  Soon after, in October 2010, Yogurt Mountain locations began appearing inside Books-A-Million superstores, beginning in Lakeland, Florida.

See also
 List of frozen yogurt companies

References

External links
 

Companies based in Birmingham, Alabama
Restaurants in Alabama
Economy of the Southeastern United States
Regional restaurant chains in the United States
Restaurants established in 2009
Frozen yogurt businesses
2009 establishments in Alabama